Madampagama is a village in Galle District, Southern Province, Sri Lanka. It is famous for its coir works. Madampagama is near Ambalangoda and Hikkaduwa.

Schools 
Madampagama Central College is the most leading and popular mixed school situated in Madampagama. The other leading schools are Kuleegoda Vidyalaya & Kumara Kashyapa Vidyalaya.

References

Populated places in Southern Province, Sri Lanka